Church of St. John the Baptist  in Banja of Peja, in the municipality of Peja, Kosovo, was built in 1998 by Rajović family. It belonged to the Diocese of Raška and Prizren of the Serbian Orthodox Church.

Architecture
The church was designed with complex basis, in three parts with three bell towers. Bell towers are basically open on four sides. A narthex and nave are in the form of an inscribed cross. The authors of the project were Ljubiša Folić and Radomir Folić. The temple was painted by Dragomir Jašović. The frescoes have been painted by a famous Serbian fresco painter and traditional musician Pavle Aksentijević. Mosaics were done by Zdravko Vajagić, and chandelier and crosses were made by Bane Rakalić. The bells were made in the foundry "Popović".

The destruction of the church in 1999 
In 1999, after the arrival of the Italian KFOR troops, the church was burned and damaged by Kosovo Albanians.

See also 
 Destroyed Serbian heritage in Kosovo

References

External links 

 The list of destroyed and desecrated churches in Kosovo and Metohija June-October 1999 (Списак уништених и оскрнављених цркава на Косову и Метохији јун-октобар 1999)

Religious buildings and structures in Peja
Serbian Orthodox church buildings in Kosovo
Destroyed churches in Kosovo
Former Serbian Orthodox churches
20th-century Serbian Orthodox church buildings
Persecution of Serbs
Christian organizations established in 1998
Cultural heritage of Kosovo